Lilydale Airport  is a privately owned aerodrome located in the regional suburb of Yering, Victoria, Australia. It caters to private and recreational pilots, and offers flight training, air charters and aircraft rentals.

See also
List of airports in Victoria
Transportation in Australia

References

Transport in Melbourne
Airports in Victoria (Australia)
Buildings and structures in the Shire of Yarra Ranges